Jessica Marie Steffens (born April 7, 1987) is an American water polo player. She was a member of the United States national teams that won a silver medal at the 2008 Summer Olympics and a gold medal at the 2012 Summer Olympics. She also played at Stanford University.

Personal life
Steffens was born in San Francisco, California to Peggy Schnugg and Carlos Steffens. Her father, a native of Puerto Rico, became interested in the sport of water polo after witnessing a match as a child in Puerto Rico. He played for Puerto Rico in three Pan American Games. Her father left the island and joined the water polo team of University of California, Berkeley where he became a three-time All-American, leading the California Golden Bears to the 1977 NCAA championship. In 1979, he was the PAC-10 player of the year in water polo.

Her sister Maggie is also on the U.S. national team.

Career

High school
Steffens, inspired by her father, played on the water polo team for four years at Monte Vista High School. She led the team to the NCS championship twice.

College
Steffens started her career at Stanford University as a freshman in 2006. She scored 15 goals that season, as the Cardinal finished third at the NCAA championships. The following year, she scored 35 goals, and Stanford finished second in the country.

Steffens redshirted the 2008 season to train with the U.S. national team while they prepared for the 2008 Olympics. She returned to Stanford in 2009, scored 12 goals, and was named to the All-MPSF first team and All-National Collegiate first team. In her senior year, she scored 17 goals, helping Stanford advance to the NCAA final.

International
Steffens scored five goals in the 2007 Pan American Games, as the U.S. finished first. At the 2008 Summer Olympics, she scored five goals, helping the U.S. win the silver medal, and was named to the Olympic Media All-Star team. At the 2009 FINA World Championships, she scored four times, and the U.S. won gold.

Steffens did not compete in 2010 following shoulder surgery. She returned in 2011 and helped the U.S. win the gold medal at the Pan American Games. She then won a gold medal with the U.S. at the 2012 Summer Olympics.

Awards
In 2019, Steffens was inducted into the USA Water Polo Hall of Fame.

See also
 United States women's Olympic water polo team records and statistics
 List of Olympic champions in women's water polo
 List of Olympic medalists in water polo (women)
 List of world champions in women's water polo
 List of World Aquatics Championships medalists in water polo

References

External links
 

1987 births
Living people
American people of Puerto Rican descent
Sportspeople from San Francisco
American female water polo players
Water polo centre backs
Water polo players at the 2008 Summer Olympics
Water polo players at the 2012 Summer Olympics
Medalists at the 2008 Summer Olympics
Medalists at the 2012 Summer Olympics
Olympic gold medalists for the United States in water polo
Olympic silver medalists for the United States in water polo
World Aquatics Championships medalists in water polo
Water polo players at the 2007 Pan American Games
Water polo players at the 2011 Pan American Games
Pan American Games medalists in water polo
Pan American Games gold medalists for the United States
Stanford Cardinal women's water polo players
Stanford Graduate School of Business alumni
Stanford MBA Class of 2018
Medalists at the 2011 Pan American Games